Frăsinet or Frăsinetu may refer to several places in Romania:

 Frăsinet, Călărași, a commune in Călăraşi County
 Frăsinet, Teleorman, a commune in Teleorman County
 Frăsinet, a village in Calvini Commune, Buzău County
 Frăsinet, a village in Băișoara Commune, Cluj County
 Frăsinet, a village in Breaza town, Prahova County
 Scrind-Frăsinet, a village in Mărgău Commune, Cluj County
 Frăsinet (river), a river in Olt County
 Frăsinetu, a village in Dobrosloveni Commune, Olt County
 Frăsinetu de Jos, a village in Frăsinet Commune, Călărași County

See also 
 Frasin (disambiguation)
 Frasinu (disambiguation)